Apptix is an application service provider (ASP) technology company providing hosted business services (or software as a service). Apptix serves businesses customers in industries such as healthcare.

Apptix's services include Microsoft Exchange email, VoIP phone service and Microsoft SharePoint collaboration services, web conferencing/secure IM, email encryption, mobile device management and messaging, Active Directory management, and archiving and backup services.

In September 2015, GoDaddy Inc, acquired public cloud customer division of Apptix in a $22.5 million cash deal.

History
Apptix was founded in 1997 after being spun off from TeleComputing ASA, of Oslo Norway. The company is headquartered in Herndon, Virginia, USA, with additional locations in Florida and Texas. Apptix is publicly traded on the Oslo Stock Exchange (OSE: APP). Apptix has acquired and integrated other hosted Exchange vendors ASP-One, Mi8, and Mailstreet.

In 2011, revenues totaled US$40.7 million, up 5% from $38.6 million in 2010. Positive net income trends have continued for the first three quarters of 2012.

In 2020, medical device vendor Zoll sued Barracuda Networks, an IT firm that provided software and services to Apptix, which in turn provided secure storage of patients' personal information to Zoll. Zoll sued the IT firm after a server migration error compromised the personal and medical data of patients. In 2021, a federal judge in Massachusetts dismissed the allegations of Zoll Medical Corp against Barracuda Networks.

Partners
Apptix is a Microsoft partner, offering hosted Microsoft Exchange and Microsoft SharePoint services. Apptix's other technology partners include Parallels, as well as Symantec, Sonian, Mozy.

Apptix's channel partners include Insight Enterprises, MegaPath, Cincinnati Bell, Inc., Web.com, and Sprint Nextel Corporation.

Awards
 Recipient of the "Excellence in Innovation" award from Parallels
 Recipient of the Silver award for the Best in Biz Awards 2011 Support Department of the Year

References

External links
 

VoIP companies of the United States
Telecommunications companies established in 1997
Cloud applications
Companies listed on the Oslo Stock Exchange